Lasiopogon is a genus of flowering plants in the family Asteraceae native to Southern Africa.

 Species

References

 
Asteraceae genera
Flora of Southern Africa
Taxonomy articles created by Polbot